Dreams  is an album by Philip Bailey released on Heads Up International Records in 1999. The album peaked at No. 43 on the Billboard Top Jazz Albums chart.

Overview
Dreams features guest appearances by artists such as Grover Washington Jr., George Duke, Kirk Whalum, Gerald Veasley, Marcus Miller, and Gerald Albright. On the album, Bailey covered Pat Metheny's "Something to Remind You", Bread's "Make It with You" and Earth, Wind & Fire's "Sailaway" which was featured on the band's 1980 album Faces.

Track listing

Personnel 

Musicians
 Philip Bailey – lead and backing vocals
 Robert Brookins – keyboards, programming
 George Duke – acoustic piano, synthesizers 
 Eric Huber – keyboards, programming
 Joe McBride – acoustic piano
 Morris Pleasure – keyboards, programming
 Steve Scalfati – keyboards, programming, guitars
 Pat Metheny – guitars
 Peter White – acoustic guitar
 Douglas Barnett – acoustic bass
 Marcus Miller – bass 
 Gerald Veasley – bass
 Mark Ivester – drums
 Luis Conte – percussion
 Gerald Albright – saxophone
 Everette Harp – soprano saxophone
 Donald Hayes – saxophone
 Grover Washington, Jr. – saxophone
 Kirk Whalum – saxophone
 Randy Brecker – trumpet,  flugelhorn
 Darnell Alexander – backing vocals
 Valerie Davis – backing vocals

Production
 Robert Brookins – producer, engineer 
 Eric Huber – producer, engineer 
 Morris Pleasure – producer 
 Dave Love – executive producer
 Gerald Albright – engineer 
 Rick Braun – engineer
 Wayne Holmes – engineer 
 Denny Jiosa – engineer
 Mark Knox – engineer 
 Scott Noll – engineer
 Joe Primeau – engineer
 Reed Ruddy – engineer
 Martin Walters – engineer 
 Peter White – engineer 
 Erik Zobler – engineer
 Peter Figen – photography

References

1999 albums
Philip Bailey albums
Albums produced by Philip Bailey
Heads Up International albums